NGC 6956 is a barred spiral galaxy located in the constellation Delphinus. It is located at a distance of about 214 million light-years from Earth.

References

External links 

NGC 6956 on SIMBAD

Barred spiral galaxies
Seyfert galaxies
Cepheus (constellation)
6956
11619
65269
+02-53-001
J20435368+1230429